The Standing Committee on Vaccination at the Robert Koch Institute (
), or STIKO, is a scientific committee comprising 18 members at the Robert Koch Institute in Berlin, Germany that provides official recommendations for the vaccination schedules used by the individual German states. The committee meets twice yearly to review the latest research regarding vaccination against infectious diseases. Although the STIKO makes recommendations, immunization in Germany is voluntary and there are no official government recommendations. German Federal States typically follow the STIKO's recommendations minimally, although each state can make recommendations for their geographic jurisdiction that extends beyond the recommended list. In addition to the proposed immunization schedule for children and adults, the STIKO recommends vaccinations for occupational groups, police, travelers, and other at risk groups.

History 
The STIKO was established in 1972 as a department of the German Federal Health Agency in Berlin. During a reorganization of the Federal Health Agency in 1994, the STIKO was attached to the Robert Koch Institute (RKI) in Berlin which was now an independent Upper-level federal agency under the purview of the Federal Ministry of Health (BMG). RKI compiles data of immunization status upon the entry of children at school, and measures vaccine coverage of Germany at a national level.

The legal basis for the STIKO is §20 of the Infection Protection Act (or IfSG). Members of the expert body are appointed by the Federal Ministry of Health in coordination with the state ministries of health. Additional expert representatives from the Paul Ehrlich Institute, Robert Koch Institute Federal and state ministries of health attend the meetings in an advisory capacity.

Responsibility 
The commission's responsibility is to provide scientifically based recommendations regarding the necessary vaccinations in Germany. Due to the importance of the recommendations, these have been codified in the Infection Protection Act since 2001. In accordance with the goals of the Infection Protection Act, the recommendations are focused on vaccinations that are most relevant to the protection of public health.

The law does not require the commission to perform cost–benefit analysis on individual vaccinations. The commission's recommendations are based on a vaccine's risk–benefit ratio, evaluating the effectiveness of a vaccine versus any risks posed. The commission has developed criteria to minimize vaccine injuries caused by side effects.

German health insurance companies are obligated to cover the cost of any immunizations recommended by the STIKO after they have been reviewed the Federal Joint Committee (G-BA). The G-BA generally adopts the commission's recommendations, although minor differences do exist.

Membership 
The members of the STIKO are appointed by the Federal Ministry for Health for 3-year terms. The members serve pro bono publico. Members include experts from many scientific disciplines and public health fields and professionals with extensive experience on vaccination.

For the period of 2020 through 2023, the commission has the following members:
 Chairman: Thomas Mertens, medical director of the Institute for Virology at the University Clinic of Ulm.
 Deputy Chairwoman: Sabine Wicker, Director of the occupational health services at the Universitätsklinikum Frankfurt at Goethe University Frankfurt
 Christian Bogdan, director of the Microbiological Institute at the University Clinic of Erlangen
 Gerd-Dieter Burchard, Bernhard Nocht Institute for Tropical Medicine, Hamburg
 Edeltraut Garbe, Leibniz-Institut für Präventionsforschung und Epidemiologie, Bremen
 Ulrich Heininger, Head doctor of the Pediatric Infectiology and Vaccinology department at the University Children’s Hospital Basel (Switzerland)
 Eva Hummers-Pradier, Director of the Institute for General Medicine at University of Göttingen
 Thomas Ledig, general practitioner and research associate of the University Hospital Heidelberg
 Martina Littmann, Director of the Department for Infection Prevention at the State Office for Health and Social Affairs of Mecklenburg-Vorpommern, Rostock
 Jörg J. Meerpohl, Co-Director of Cochrane Deutschland at the University Medical Center Freiburg
 Marianne Röbl-Mathieu, Gynecologist, Munich
 Martin Terhardt, Pediatrician, Berlin
 Klaus Überla, Director of the Virological Institute of University Clinic of Erlangen
 Marianne van der Sande, Netherlands National Institute for Public Health and the Environment, Center Infectious Disease Control, Bilthoven (Netherlands)
 Rüdiger von Kries, Director of the Epidemiology Department and Leiter der Abteilung Epidemiologie und acting head of the Institute for Social Pediatrics at the Ludwig Maximilian University of Munich
 Gudrun Widders, Ministry of Health at the district office of Spandau, Berlin
 Ursula Wiedermann, Medical University of Vienna, Vienna
 Fred Zepp, Director of the Center for Child and Youth Medicine at the University Hospital, Johannes Gutenberg-Universität Mainz

See also 
 National Immunization Technical Advisory Group (the global concept)
 Advisory Committee on Immunization Practices (United States)
 Joint Committee on Vaccination and Immunisation (United Kingdom)
 National Advisory Committee on Immunization (Canada)

References 

1972 establishments in Germany
Medical and health organisations based in Berlin
Robert Koch Institute
Vaccination-related organizations